Rhynchelmis orientalis is a freshwater worm.

It was described by Yamaguchi in 1936 from specimens collected on Hokkaidō. It can be distinguished from other species in the genus by "the possession of very long spermathecae running in several posterior segments into spermsacs and having no communication with the alimentary tract." The genital elements are positioned in a fashion similar to that of Rhynchelmis vejdovskyi.

Rhynchelmis orientalis is pinkish to purplish, of variable size. The number of segments is between 196 and 245, and the setae are one-pointed.

Lumbriculidae